Euteliidae is a family of moths in the superfamily Noctuoidea. The family was erected by Augustus Radcliffe Grote in 1882.

Genera

References

 
Noctuidae